Val Jobara (born June 18, 1980) is a Swedish film, stage and television actor, best known for his role as Nervous in the film Kick-Ass and The Italian in the film Rush, directed by Ron Howard.

Early life 
Jobara was born Helsingborg, Sweden.  As a teenager he left to pursue his dream and ended up studying photography at Istituto Europeo di Design in Rome, Italy under the great Antonio Barella, only to be kicked out shortly after because lack of discipline "I was young and thought partying was more fun". Shortly after a friend successfully convinced him to be an extra in the film Gangs of New York.

In 2005 he enrolled in a theater-course at Stella Adler Academy of Acting and moved to Los Angeles to study theater.

Career 
Upon graduating from the Adler, Jobara  made his move to New York where he got cast in the Off-Broadway play  Savage in Limbo.

Jobara appeared in the BBC drama The Kane Conspiracy as Agent Wood and Nervous, in Matthew Vaughn and Jane Goldman's film Kick-Ass,  based on the superhero comic book of the same name by Mark Millar.

Filmography

Theatre

References

External links 
 
 

1980 births
Living people
People from Helsingborg
Swedish male film actors